Kirkhaugh is a very small village and former civil parish, now in the parish of Knaresdale with Kirkhaugh, adjacent to the River South Tyne in Northumberland, England. In 1951 the parish had a population of 79.

Governance 
Kirkhaugh is in the parliamentary constituency of Hexham. On 1 April 1955 the parish was abolished to form Knaresdale with Kirkhaugh.

Railways
Although the Standard Gauge Alston Line from Haltwhistle to Alston passed through Kirkhaugh, there was no station here when normal British Rail passenger services operated. The line opened in 1852 and closed in 1976.

Since 1983 a narrow-gauge railway has opened on part of the original trackbed. The railway, known as the South Tynedale Railway, is a 2-foot (0.61 m) gauge line and runs  from Alston to Slaggyford, through a station at Kirkhaugh, and includes a viaduct over the River South Tyne.

Religious sites 
The church, rebuilt in 1869, is thought to be the only English church dedicated to the Holy Paraclete (that is, the Holy Spirit).

See also 
Alston Line, the railway from Haltwhistle to Alston
Kirkhaugh cairns, an archaeological site at Kirkhaugh
South Tynedale Railway

References

External links

Northumberland Communities (Accessed: 3 December 2008)

Villages in Northumberland
Former civil parishes in Northumberland